Clone Wars (Star Wars), a series of conflicts in the fictional Star Wars universe

Clone Wars may also refer to:

Star Wars

Film and television
 Star Wars: Clone Wars (2003 TV series), an animated micro tv series (2003-2005)
 Star Wars: The Clone Wars (2008 TV series), a computer animated tv series (2008-2014, 2020)
 Star Wars: The Clone Wars (film), a 2008 theatrical film serving as the pilot for the series

Print media 
Star Wars: Clone Wars (comics), various comic series and trade paperbacks 
Star Wars: Clone Wars, a 2008 photo comic adaptation of the tv series
Star Wars: The Clone Wars (novel), a 2008 novelization of the film
Star Wars: The Clone Wars, a 2008 junior novelization of the film
Star Wars: The Clone Wars Comic UK, Volumes 5 and 6 (2009-2013) of Star Wars Comic UK 
Star Wars: The Clone Wars Magazine, a US reprint of the UK magazine (2010-2014)
Star Wars: The Clone Wars: Wild Space, a novel by Karen Miller (2008)
Star Wars: The Clone Wars: No Prisoners, a novel by Karen Traviss (2009)
Various young reader novels adapting The Clone Wars TV series

Games
 Star Wars: The Clone Wars (2002 video game), developed by Pandemic Studios and published by LucasArts
 Star Wars: The Clone Wars – Jedi Alliance, a 2008 video game for the Nintendo DS
 Star Wars: The Clone Wars – Lightsaber Duels, a 2008 video game for the Wii
 Star Wars: The Clone Wars, a 2008 mobile game by THQ Wireless
 Star Wars: The Clone Wars – Republic Heroes, a 2009 video game for multiple platforms, such as Xbox 360, PC, Playstation 3, Wii, PSP and Nintendo DS. 
 Star Wars: Clone Wars Adventures, a 2010 video game for PC and OS X.
 Lego Star Wars III: The Clone Wars, a 2011 video game for multiple platforms, such as Playstation 3, Xbox 360, PC, PSP and Nintendo DS.
 Star Wars: The Clone Wars, a 2022 board game

Music 
 Star Wars: The Clone Wars (Original Motion Picture Soundtrack), by Kevin Kiner (2008)
 Star Wars: The Clone Wars (Original Soundtrack Seasons One through Six), by Kevin Kiner (2014)
 Star Wars: The Clone Wars - The Final Season (Episode 1-4) [Original Soundtrack], by Kevin Kiner (2020)
 Star Wars: The Clone Wars - The Final Season (Episode 5-8) [Original Soundtrack], by Kevin Kiner (2020)
 Star Wars: The Clone Wars - The Final Season (Episode 9-12) [Original Soundtrack], by Kevin Kiner (2020)

Other
 X-Men 2: Clone Wars, a 1995 video game

See also
Star Wars: Episode II – Attack of the Clones, a 2002 film
 Star Wars: Episode II – Attack of the Clones (soundtrack), soundtrack of the film of the same name
 Star Wars: Episode II – Attack of the Clones (novel), novel based on the film of the same name
 Star Wars: Episode II – Attack of the Clones (video game), video game based on the film of the same name